INFINITT Healthcare Co. Ltd. is a South Korea-based healthcare IT development company. INFINITT Healthcare specializes in medical imaging and information technology, such as PACS, VNA, and cloud-based software and services.

History
INFINITT Healthcare started from Mediface, which was the PACS R&D center at Medison and separately founded in 1997. In 2002, it merged to 3DMed and changed its name to INFINITT Technology. It acquired Marotech and Neobit in 2005 and Mevisys in 2007 and chose its current name "INFINITT Healthcare" in September 2009. It was listed on KOSDAQ (the Korean stock market) in May 2010.

Worldwide Facilities
INFINITT Healthcare has 10 major global offices (including the headquarters in South Korea, Seoul). Products and Solutions are provided through these global business units and several other international sales distributors.

INFINITT Taiwan, established 2003
INFINITT Japan, established 2004
INFINITT China, established 2004
INFINITT North America, established 2005
INFINITT Europe, established 2009
INFINITT South East Asia, established 2009
INFINITT United Kingdom, established 2010
INFINITT Middle East Africa, established 2011
INFINITT Brazil, established 2011
INFINITT Indonesia, established 2014

Products
INFINITT Healthcare's products include:
Imaging technology and viewers for radiology, cardiology, radiation oncology, dentistry and mammography
3D and advanced visualization software for all major medical departments
Clinical Information Systems
Dose monitoring system
Vendor neutral archive (VNA) technology
Cloud-based and tele-radiology services
Consulting, remote monitoring and data migration services

References

Health information technology companies
Medical imaging
Companies based in Seoul
Companies listed on the Korea Exchange
Health care companies established in 1997
South Korean brands
Medical technology companies of South Korea